Edgar Straessley Robb (born December 23, 1937) is an American law enforcement officer and politician. As an FBI agent, he went undercover as Tony Rossi. As Tony Rossi, and alongside agent Joseph Pistone (Donnie Brasco), Robb infiltrated organized crime in Miami, Florida.

Sources
 D. Lea Jacobs. Friend of the Family: An Undercover Agent in the Mafia, Howells House 
 Pistone, Joseph D.; & Woodley, Richard (1999) Donnie Brasco: My Undercover Life in the Mafia, Hodder & Stoughton. .
 Pistone, Joseph D.; & Brandt, Charles (2007). Donnie Brasco: Unfinished Business, Running Press. .
 DeStefano, Anthony. The Last Godfather: Joey Massino & the Fall of the Bonanno Crime Family. California: Citadel, 2006.

References

1937 births
Living people
Federal Bureau of Investigation agents
Virginia sheriffs
Virginia Republicans
People from Albemarle County, Virginia